Minerva Theatre may refer to:

Minerva Theatre, Chichester
Minerva Theatre, Kolkata
Minerva Theatre, Sydney